The Southern League Cup 1940–41 was the first edition of the regional war-time football tournament.

Group stage

Group A

Group B

Group C

Group D

Semi-finals

Final

Replay

Teams

References

External links
Southern League Cup at Scottish Football Historical Archive (archived version, 2009)

season
1940–41 in Scottish football